The Department of Revenue and Land Survey is a government department under Government of Kerala that manages all government owned lands and decides land use policies in the Indian state of Kerala. The department is also a government agency, deriving various taxes on land, as well as lease amounts from various government lands, which are principal sources of income for the Government. In addition, the department manages land-use policy, survey of land areas, and effective management and implementation of land reforms.

History
The department was established as part of Travancore reforms of 1811, when H.H Maharani Gowri Parvati Bayi, the Regent of Travancore, legalized the department and appointed Subba Rao as Diwan Peshkar of Travancore Pandra Vakkuppu.

Sub-departments
 Land Revenue Department
 Directorate of Survey and Land Records
 The State Land Board
 Disaster Management Authority

Institute of Land and Disaster Management is an autonomous body that provides training to members of the department.

References

External links
 Kerala Department of Revenue
 Ferrantello Group

Revenue
Surveying of India
Surveying organizations